Svislach District is a district (rajon) in Grodno Region, Belarus.

The administrative center is Svislach.

Notable residents 

 Vincent Hadleŭski (1888, village of Porozowo (now Šuryčy) – 1942), Belarusian Catholic priest, publicist and politician, victim of the Nazi repressions

References

 
Districts of Grodno Region